Samuel Thomas Lane (born 21 February 1991 in Brisbane, Australia) is a rugby union footballer, currently playing with Italian side Rugby Calvisano in the Top12 and European Rugby Continental Shield. His regular playing position is fly-half.

Career

He made his debut for the  during the 2012 Super Rugby season. He previously represented Western Province in South Africa's Vodacom Cup.

Lane attended Bishops in Cape Town, South Africa and played in their First XV in 2008 and 2009 alongside Springbok Nizaam Carr. Lane was the Bishops captain in 2009 and made the Western Province Craven Week side that year.

He is the son of former Wallabies assistant coach Tim Lane.
 
He was initially included in the  extended playing squad for the 2013 Super Rugby season, but later voluntarily withdrew in order to concentrate on his recovery from knee surgery.

Rugby Calvisano

Lane signs with Rugby Calvisano.<ref name=  which is based in Calvisano (Province of Brescia), in Lombardy, as Fly-half.

Reference List

External links
 Waratahs profile
 
 itsrugby.co.uk

Australian rugby union players
Queensland Reds players
Rugby union fly-halves
Sportsmen from Queensland
1991 births
Rugby union players from Brisbane
Living people
Sydney (NRC team) players